Anuk de Alwis (born 18 November 1991) is a Sri Lankan cricketer. He made his first-class debut for Sri Lanka Ports Authority Cricket Club in the 2011–12 Premier League Tournament on 10 February 2012.

References

External links
 

1991 births
Living people
Sri Lankan cricketers
Kalutara Town Club cricketers
Sri Lanka Ports Authority Cricket Club cricketers
Tamil Union Cricket and Athletic Club cricketers